Actinopus excavatus is a species of mygalomorph spiders in the family Actinopodidae. It is found in Argentina.

References

excavatus
Spiders described in 2018